Belarus competed at the 2012 European Athletics Championships held in Helsinki, Finland, between 27 June to 1 July 2012.

Medals

Results

Men

Track

Field

Combined

Women

Track

Field

References
 

2012
Nations at the 2012 European Athletics Championships
2012 in Belarusian sport